Dash Tappeh (also Romanized as Dāsh Tappeh; also known as Dash-Tepe) is a village in Qareh Poshtelu-e Bala Rural District, Qareh Poshtelu District, Zanjan County, Zanjan Province, Iran. At the 2006 census, its population was 263, in 56 families.

References 

Populated places in Zanjan County